Supachai Chaided (born 1 December 1998) is a Thai professional footballer who plays as a forward for Thai League 1 club Buriram United and the Thailand national team.

Personal life
Supachai was born in Pattani which is located in Southern Thailand. He was born into a Muslim family of Thai Malay descent.

International career
In 2018 he was called up by Thailand national team for the 2018 AFF Suzuki Cup.

Supachai was named for the final squad in 2019 AFC Asian Cup.

International goals 
Senior
Scores and results list Thailand's goal tally first.

Honours

Club
Buriram United
 Thai League 1 (3): 2017, 2018, 2021–22
 Thai FA Cup: 2021–22
 Thai League Cup: 2021–22
 Mekong Club Championship: 2016
 Thailand Champions Cup: 2019

International
Thailand U-19
 AFF U-19 Youth Championship: 2015

Thailand
 AFF Championship: 2020

Individual
 FA Thailand Award
 Thai League Most Valuable Players (1) : 2021-22

References

External links

1998 births
Living people
Supachai Chaided
Supachai Chaided
Supachai Chaided
Association football forwards
Supachai Chaided
Supachai Chaided
Supachai Chaided
Footballers at the 2018 Asian Games
2019 AFC Asian Cup players
Supachai Chaided
Competitors at the 2019 Southeast Asian Games
Supachai Chaided
Supachai Chaided